Oocarpais is a genus of mites in the family Parasitidae.

Species
 Oocarpais donisthorpei Berlese, 1916

References

Parasitidae